Rocus Lamare (born 22 September 1986) is an Indian professional footballer who plays as a midfielder for Salgaocar in the I-League.

Career
Born in Shillong, Meghalaya, Lamare started his career with the Shillong Lajong youth academy before moving to Mohun Bagan. While with the Kolkata club, Lamare played in the National Football League. At the end of the 2003–04 season, Lamare moved to Goa to sign with Salgaocar. During his twelve seasons with Salgaocar, Lamare helped the club win the I-League and the Federation Cup in 2011. Following that season, Lamare was selected to be part of the 2011–12 FPAI Team of the Year.

On 18 July 2016, it was revealed that Lamare had been released by Salgaocar before the 2016–17 season.

International
Lamare had represented India at the youth level at both under-17 and under-20 levels. Lamare also represented the senior India side from 2004 to 2014.

Honours

Salgaocar
 I-League: 2010–11
 Federation Cup: 2011
 Durand Cup: 2014

India
 SAFF Championship: 2011

References

External links 
 

1986 births
Living people
People from Shillong
Indian footballers
Shillong Lajong FC players
Mohun Bagan AC players
Salgaocar FC players
Association football midfielders
Footballers from Meghalaya
I-League players
India international footballers
India youth international footballers